General Robb may refer to:

Douglas J. Robb (fl. 1970s–2010s), U.S. Air Force lieutenant general 
Frederick Robb (1858–1948), British Army major general
William Robb (British Army officer) (1888–1961), British Army major general